Our Lady Of Vailankanni High School is situated at Link Road near Yogi Nagar in the suburb of Mumbai, Borivali West, India. The school was founded in 1982 by Mrs Sally De Silva. The Primary Head is Ina De Silva and the Secondary Head is Mr.Sanjay Tiwari.

History 
The school started in shops in Jairaj Nagar in 1982 and then the founder of school Mrs Sally De Silva built a small building on Link Road, near Yogi Nagar, where the school has existed since 1991.

Academics 
The school has had continuous 100% results from 1999 to 2009 with the exception of a few year where on an average it has always given results of 95% and above as the passing average rate for Secondary School Certificate (SSC) Exams.

Alumni 
 Rohit Sharma, cricketer

References 

High schools and secondary schools in Mumbai
Borivali